The enzyme 3,4-dihydroxyphenylalanine reductive deaminase (EC 4.3.1.22, reductive deaminase, DOPA-reductive deaminase, DOPARDA; systematic name 3,4-dihydroxy-L-phenylalanine ammonia-lyase (3,4-dihydroxyphenylpropanoate-forming))  catalyses the following chemical reaction

 L-dopa + 2 NADH  3,4-dihydroxyphenylpropanoate + 2 NAD+ + NH3

This enzyme participates in L-phenylalanine catabolism in the anaerobic phototrophic bacterium Rhodobacter sphaeroides OU5.

References

External links 
 

EC 4.3.1